Heldmaschine (German for "Hero Machine") are a German Neue Deutsche Härte band formed in 2008 in Koblenz as a parallel project from the Rammstein cover band Völkerball. After releasing their first album they changed their name to Heldmaschine and decided to focus on original music.

Their first album, Weichen und Zunder, was originally released by Völkerball but with the addition of Weichen + Zunder. It was re-released in 2013 by Heldmashine but with a line-up change – the brother of singer René Anlauff, Marco Schulte (bass), took over for Tilmann Carbow and Andreas Schanowski. The position of keyboard player was abolished.

Discography

Albums 
 2012: Weichen und Zunder (Switches and tinder)
 2014: Propaganda
 2015: Lügen (Lying)
 2016: Himmelskörper (Heavenly body)
 2018: Live und laut (Live and loud)
 2019: Im Fadenkreuz (In the crosshair)

EPs 
 2019: Volles Brett (Full board)

Singles 
 2011: Gammelfleisch (Rotten meat, from Weichen und Zunder album)
 2012: Radioaktiv (Radioactive, from Weichen und Zunder album)
 2013: Weiter! (Further!, from Propaganda album)
 2014: Propaganda (from Propaganda album)
 2015: Wer einmal lügt (Who lies once, Lügen)
 2015: Collateral (Lügen)
 2016: Sexschuss (Sexshot, Himmelskörper)
 2020: Radioshow (Non-Album Track)
 2021: Lockdown (Non-Album Track)

Music videos 
 2012: Radioaktiv (Radioactive)
 2013: Doktor  (Doctor)
 2013: Weiter! (Further!)
 2014: Propaganda
 2015: Wer einmal lügt (Who lies once)
 2015: Maskenschlacht (Battle of Masks)
 2016: Sexschuss (Sexshott)
 2017: Die Braut, das Meer (The Bride, the Sea)
 2019: Gottverdammter Mensch (Goddamn human)
 2020: Radioshow
 2020: Lockdown

References

External links 

 Official website

German Neue Deutsche Härte music groups
German rock music groups
German heavy metal musical groups